Springfield is a historic plantation house located near Heathsville, Northumberland County, Virginia.  It was built between 1828 and 1830, and is a -story, Federal style brick mansion with a central-hall plan house covered by a gable roof. It has -story, stepped-gable wings containing round-arched windows. It was enlarged and renovated in the 1850s, with the addition of Greek Revival style design elements.  The house features a pedimented two-level tetrastyle portico with fluted columns.

It was listed on the National Register of Historic Places in 1979.

References

Plantation houses in Virginia
Houses on the National Register of Historic Places in Virginia
Federal architecture in Virginia
Greek Revival houses in Virginia
Houses completed in 1830
Houses in Northumberland County, Virginia
National Register of Historic Places in Northumberland County, Virginia
1830 establishments in Virginia